Mohammed Uthman al-Mirghani, known as Al-Khatim, was the founder of the Khatmiyya sufi tariqa, a sect of Islam, that has a following in Egypt, Sudan, Eritrea, Somalia and Ethiopia.

Family
He was born into the Mirghani family in Mecca which was one of the most noble families that have descended from the Islamic prophet Muhammad. He is the son of Muhammad Abu Bakr who is the son of Abdallah al-Mahjoub who is the son of Ibrahim who is a descendant of the Prophet Muhammad. The lineage of Muhammad Othman al-Mirghani was verified by Murtada al-Zubeidi and this was further verified by al-Jabarti in his book Taareekh al-Jabarti / al-Jabarti's History part two.

Sayyid Mohammed Uthman bin Muhammad Abu Bakr bin Abd Allah al-Mahjoubi al-Mirghani was a descendant of Prophet Muhammad through Imam Hasan al-Askari, his genealogy lineage:

 Prophet Muhammad
 Ali ibn Abi Talib and Fatima Al Zahra
 Imam Hussain
 Imam Ali Zayn al-Abidin
 Imam Muhammad al Baqir 
 Imam Ja'far al-Sâdiq
 Imam Musa al-Kazim
 Imam Ali al Reza
 Imam Muhammad al Taqi
 Imam Ali al Hadi
 Imam Hasan al-Askari al-Khalis
 Sayyid Ali al-Muttaqi 
 Sayyid Mir Uthman
 Sayyid Mir Ali
 Sayyid Mir Umar
 Sayyid Mir Khurd Bukhari
 Sayyid Ismail
 Sayyid Muhammad
 Sayyid Ali
 Sayyid Abu Bakr Hasan
 Sayyid Isa Hasan
 Sayyid Yahya
 Sayyid Ibrahim
 Sayyid Ali
 Sayyid Ahmad
 Sayyid Hasan
 Sayyid Ali
 Sayyid Abd Allah
 Sayyid Hasan
 Sayyid Haydar
 Sayyid Mir Khurd
 Sayyid Hasan
 Sayyid Ali Mirghani
 Sayyid Muhammad Amin
 Sayyid Hasan
 Sayyid Ibrahim
 Sayyid Abd Allah al-Mahjoubi
 Sayyid Muhammad Abu Bakr
 Sayyid Muhammad Othman al-Mirghani

Muhammad Uthman al-Mirghani was born in Ta'if and died in Mecca and was buried there in AlMa'alla.

His sons followed in his footsteps after his death, the most famous of whom were Muhammad al-Hassan al-Mirghani, Gaafar as-Sadig al-Mirghani, Abdullahi al-Mahjoub al-Mirghani, Hashim al-Mirghani and Sirr al-Khatim al-Mirghani.

Travels
Al-Khatim's religious journey began in Mecca from whence he travelled to Tarim in Yemen and then to Somalia by sea and to Massawa on the Red Sea coast where he travelled inland into the Ethiopian hinterland before returning to Mecca. On this trip tens of thousands of people embraced Islam including entire clans and tribes.

On his second trip, which started in the Egyptian countryside south of Cairo, he was accompanied by his teacher Ahmad ibn Idris who parted ways with him in Al-Zeyniyyah. Al-Khatim traversed the Nubian lands of the Mahas and the Sakot and went to Kordofan and reached the lands of the Fur people and the Borno tribe. He then travelled to Sennar on the banks of the Blue Nile and to Shendi via Gezira and via the Butana to the Taka Mountain region near Kassala from which he entered into Ethiopia and visited many regions before returning to Mecca.

Movementism

Muhammad Othman AlMirghani AlKhatim's methodology for calling people to Islam, "movementism", was characterized by travelling and being constantly on the move. This was due to the influence of Ahmad ibn Idris whose teachings and contribution coincided with a general, early Islamic renaissance during the Ottoman Caliphate. The customary, long-used methodology for an Islamic sheikh or Imam was to remain in his abode and for people to travel from afar to seek his audience. AlKhatim's "movementism" was the exact opposite of the customary methodology that had been prevalently used by Islamic sheikhs and Imams in his time.

"Movementism" was similarly taken up by another of Ahmad ibn Idris's disciples, Senussi, who travelled to the Maghreb and founded what would eventually become the monarchy of Libya. However, AlKhatim travelled to regions and peoples where Islam was unknown and, if there was any knowledge of Islam, it was through the East African Slave Trade which caused many of these peoples to be hostile toward Islam. Examples of such regions are the Ethiopian Highlands and Eritrea and the southern region of the Blue Nile State and the Nuba Mountains, all of which have difficult terrains and complex tribal systems. AlKhatim, at only 25 years of age, managed to overcome personal physical risk, the harsh geography and the tribal complexities of these lands to call its people to Islam and to set up mosques and Islamic centres of learning which created a link between these lands and the Islamic World. Among his achievements was the establishment of the first teaching centre for the education of women in Sudan. His literary contribution to Islam spanned a wide range of topics from the explanation of the Quran (Taj Altafaseer), through the listing of the Hadith (Fateh Al-Rasool), Fiqh and behaviour (Munjiyat Al-Abeed), Muhammedan Biography (Al-Asrar Al-Rabaniya Fi Mawlid Khair Al-Bareya), Madeeh or description of the Muhammedan traits (Alnour Al-Barraq Fi Madh Al-nabiy Al-Misdaq) to specific writings on many aspects of the Islamic religion. These are estimated to have reached over 112 many of which are yet to be disclosed.

Literature
Ali Salih Karrar, R.S. O'Fahey, The Sufi Brotherhoods in the Sudan, Northwestern University Press, 1992

References

External links
 Country Studies, Sudan Islamic Movements and Religious Orders

Sufi religious leaders
Year of birth missing
Husaynids
People from Mecca